Smithfield railway station is a railway station and bus interchange in the northern Adelaide suburb of Smithfield. It is located on the Gawler line,  from Adelaide station.

History
Smithfield station opened in June 1857 as the original terminus of the main north line, before the line was extended to Gawler in 1860. A station building and ticket office of the same design as those at North Adelaide station built in 1856 were provided. A short branch line running almost due west to the Smithfield munitions storage depot was built during World War II. This branch line was closed around 1961 when part of the depot was closed and the land sold for subdivision.

The original station building and ticket office was demolished in June 1987. By that time, the station building had been heavily vandalised.   Station shelters like the ones at Dry Creek were installed, and these remained until a new station shelter was erected in 2001. At the same time, the western platform was upgraded.

Services by platform

Bus routes

|}

|}

References

External links

Railway stations in Adelaide
Railway stations in Australia opened in 1857